SS  was a passenger cargo ship built in 1921 by the Mitsubishi Shipbuilding & Engineering Company, Nagasaki for Nippon Yusen Kisen Kaisha.

Service history
The troopship was part of convoy HI-72 and transporting 1,317 Australian and British prisoners of war (POWs) from Singapore to Formosa (Taiwan).
Another ship in the convoy was SS Kachidoki Maru with another 950 Allied POWs and 1,095 Japanese on board.

Rakuyō Maru was torpedoed by Sealion and sunk towards the evening. The Kachidoki Maru was also sunk with 488 people killed, mostly POWs. The Japanese survivors of the Rakuyō Maru were rescued by an escort vessel, leaving POWs in the water with rafts and some abandoned boats. A total of 1,159 POWs died, including sportsman Winston Ide and Brigadier Arthur Varley. 350 of the dead were bombarded in lifeboats and killed by a Japanese navy vessel the next day when they were rowing towards land. On 15 September, the three submarines returned to the area and rescued 149 surviving POWs who were on rafts. Four others died before they could be landed at Tanapag Harbor, Saipan, in the Mariana Islands.

References

External links
Video of the rescue of POW Rakuyo Maru survivors
Submarine rescue of POW survivors story
Prisoners of War of Japanese 1942-45: Surviving the Sinking of the Rakuyo Maru
Rakuyo Maru (Japanese)
Incredible Journey
IWM interview with survivor Arthur Bancroft
IWM interview with survivor Philip Beilby

1921 ships
Ships sunk by American submarines
Maritime incidents in September 1944
World War II shipwrecks in the Philippine Sea
Rakuyō Maru
Japanese hell ships